Heart's Cry may refer to:

Heart's Cry (horse), racehorse
"Heart's Cry", a 2016 song by Chris Quilala from Split the Sky
The Heart's Cry, 1994 Burkinabé/French drama film